Public Establishment of Television, abbreviated as EPTV, is a state-owned company that manages the activity of television in Algeria, going from production to broadcasting.

It is the oldest broadcasting service in the country. It currently operates an eponymous television network Télévision Algérienne, eight television channels – Canal Algérie, A3, Channel 4, Coran TV, TV6, TV7, TV8, TV9.

EPTV is an active member of the European Broadcasting Union (EBU) and Arab States Broadcasting Union (ASBU). It is also a shareholder in Euronews SA.

Network and programming

TV1

TV1 is the first Algerian general public network of Public Establishment of Television group (EPTV in French), has started to broadcast its programs on 24 December 1956 during the French colonial period in Algeria. It is one of the most important television channels in Algeria. It produces entertainment and variety programs, in addition to several Algerian series and films.

TV2

EPTV was the only television channel until 1994, when French-speaking Canal Algérie (now TV2) was created.

TV2 is available in Europe on Eutelsat satellite service (Hotbird and Astra).

It is also available on French Numericable, Monaco MC Cable cable television services, Orange TV and Freebox.

TV3

On 5 July 2001, EPTV launched a new Arabic language channel for the Arab world to give an institutional image of Algeria. On 28 October 2015, the channel has started broadcasting its programs in HD.

TV4

On 18 March 2009, EPTV launched a new Berber language channel called TV4, also referred to as Tamazight TV. The channel offers programs in Kabyle, Chaoui, Tumzabt, Chenoui and Tuareg.

TV5

On 18 March 2009, EPTV launched a new Religious channel called TV5, also referred to as Coran TV.

TV6

On 26 March 2020, EPTV launched a new channel called TV6. The channel is aimed primarily at families and absorbed the content that was formerly carried by TV3 before becoming a predominantly news channel.

TV7

On 19 May 2020, EPTV launched an educational channel called TV7. Before then, educational programming was carried on TV6.

TV8

On 12 October 2020, EPTV launched a new channel called TV8.

TV9

On 26 May 2022, EPTV launched a new channel called TV9. The channel covers proceedings from the Algerian parliament.

Further reading

See also 
 Television in Algeria

References

External links 

  
  
 ENTV Official YouTube

1962 establishments in Algeria
Mass media companies established in 1962
1986 establishments in Algeria
Mass media companies established in 1986
1991 establishments in Algeria
Mass media companies established in 1991
Companies based in Algiers
Government-owned companies of Algeria
Publicly funded broadcasters
Multilingual broadcasters
European Broadcasting Union members